The Kammel is a river in Bavaria, southern Germany. The Kammel originates west of Mindelheim, in the district Unterallgäu, and flows generally north. It flows into the Mindel (left tributary) south of Offingen at the Danube, east of Günzburg in the district Günzburg. So it is an indirect right tributary of the Danube. The difference in altitude between the origin and the mouth is 265 m.

Tributaries 
Tributaries which flow into the Kammel are (from south to north):
 the Krumbach (left tributary); confluence with the Kammel in Krumbach
 the Haselbach (right tributary); confluence with the Kammel in Naichen, municipality: Neuburg an der Kammel
 the Krähenbach (right tributary); confluence with the Kammel in Ettenbeuren, municipality: Kammeltal

Municipalities the Kammel flows through 
Municipalities which are passed by the Kammel are (from south to north):
in the district Unterallgäu: Stetten, Kammlach, Oberrieden, Pfaffenhausen and Breitenbrunn;
in the district Günzburg: Aletshausen, the town Krumbach, Neuburg an der Kammel, Kammeltal, the town Burgau and Rettenbach;

Origin of the name 
The name of the Kammel derives from the Celtic kamb or camb which means crooked. So the Kammel is the crooked water. Other authors are of the opinion that Kammel means bog. Both origins of the name can be possible because the meanders of the stream Kammel are clearly distinct.

Attractions in the valleys of the Kammel and its tributaries 
 Niederraunau: castle and church
 Krumbach → see also the section Attractions of this article
 Billenhausen: Dossenberger Pfarrhof (parsonage)
 Neuburg an der Kammel: castle, church and the pilgrimage church Maria Feldblume between Neuburg and Wattenweiler
 Edelstetten Abbey in Edelstetten in the valley of the Haselbach
 Naichen: hammer mill museum
 Wettenhausen Abbey in Wettenhausen (municipality of Kammeltal)
 Burgau → see also the section Attractions and culture of this article
 the Silbersee near Burgau, a flooded gravel pit and popular greenbelt recreation area; at the shores of this lake there is a campingsite, too;

Miscellaneous 
 parallel to the Kammel there is the 71 km long cycle track Kammeltal-Radweg
 from Breitenbrunn to Neuburg an der Kammel the Mittelschwaben Railway runs in the valley of the Kammel
 Of no other river in the district Günzburg so many kilometres have been renaturalised in the last few years as the Kammel

See also 
 map of the region passed by the Kammel
 pages on the tributaries of the Kammel in the German Wikipedia: Krumbach, Haselbach and Krähenbach
 other links to pages in the German Wikipedia: Niederraunau, Edelstetten Abbey, Hammer mill museum Naichen, List of the lakes and rivers in the drainage basin of the Mindel and List of the municipalities, places and places of interest in the district Günzburg;

References 

This article incorporates in parts text translated from the article Kammel from the German Wikipedia, retrieved on 2 August 2009

Rivers of Bavaria
Bodies of water of Günzburg (district)
Rivers of Germany